Wali Mohammed is the name of:

Wali Mohammed Wali (1667–1707), classical Urdu and Persian poet of the South Asia
Habib Wali Mohammad (1924–2014), Pakistani ghazal singer
Wali Mohammed (ISN 560), Afghan held in extrajudicial detention in the US Guantanamo Bay detention camps, Cuba
Wali Mohammed (Guantanamo detainee 547), Afghan who was detained in Guantanamo Bay